John Karl Fetterman (born August 15, 1969) is an American politician serving as the junior United States senator from Pennsylvania since 2023. A member of the Democratic Party, he served as the 34th lieutenant governor of Pennsylvania from 2019 to 2023 and the mayor of Braddock, Pennsylvania, from 2006 to 2019. Generally described as a progressive and a populist, Fetterman advocates healthcare as a right, criminal justice reform, abolishing capital punishment, raising the federal minimum wage to $15 per hour, and legalizing cannabis.

Beginning his professional career in the insurance industry, Fetterman studied finance at Albright College and earned an MBA from the University of Connecticut. He went on to join AmeriCorps and earned a Master of Public Policy degree from Harvard. Fetterman's service with AmeriCorps led him to Braddock, where he moved in 2004 and was elected mayor the next year. As mayor, Fetterman sought to revitalize the former steel town through art and youth programs.

Fetterman ran for the U.S. Senate in 2016, finishing third in the Democratic primary. He ran for lieutenant governor of Pennsylvania in 2018, defeating a field of candidates that included incumbent Mike Stack in the Democratic primary and winning the election with incumbent governor Tom Wolf. During his tenure, Fetterman received national attention for his efforts to legalize cannabis statewide and for his opposition to President Donald Trump's false claims of election fraud in Pennsylvania.

In 2021, Fetterman announced his candidacy in the 2022 U.S. Senate election in Pennsylvania. He won the Democratic nomination with 59% of the vote and defeated Republican Party nominee Mehmet Oz in the general election with 51% of the vote, becoming the first Democrat to win this seat since 1962. Fetterman resigned as lieutenant governor upon being sworn in to the Senate on January 3, 2023.

Early life and education
Fetterman was born at Reading Hospital in West Reading, Pennsylvania, to Karl and Susan Fetterman, both of whom were 19 years old. Eventually they moved to York, Pennsylvania, where Fetterman grew up and his father became a partner at an insurance firm. John Fetterman grew up in an affluent suburb of York, and his parents were conservative Republicans.
 
Fetterman had a self-described privileged upbringing; he said he "sleepwalked" as a young adult while playing four years of football in college, intending to take over ownership of his father's business eventually. In 1991, Fetterman graduated from Albright College, also his father's alma mater, with a bachelor's in finance. He also received a Master of Business Administration (MBA) from the University of Connecticut (UConn) in 1993. For two years Fetterman worked in Pittsburgh as a risk-management underwriter for Chubb.

While Fetterman was studying at UConn, his best friend died in a car accident; this impacted Fetterman's life and career. After his friend's death, Fetterman joined Big Brothers Big Sisters of America, pairing with an eight-year-old boy in New Haven, Connecticut whose father had died from AIDS and whose mother was slowly dying from the disease.

During his time as a Big Brother, Fetterman says he became "preoccupied with the concept of the random lottery of birth", and promised the boy's mother he would continue to look out for her son after she was gone. In 1995, he joined the recently founded AmeriCorps, and was sent to teach Pittsburgh students pursuing their GEDs. He later attended Harvard Kennedy School at Harvard University, graduating in 1999 with a Master of Public Policy degree.

Mayor of Braddock (2006–2019)

Fetterman, who began his career working at an insurance firm, came to Braddock in 2001 to start an Out-of-School-Youth Program, helping local youth to earn their GED. He moved to Braddock in 2004.

Braddock, a former industrial town known as the site of Andrew Carnegie's first steel mill, was hit hard by the decline of the U.S. steel industry. The town had lost 90% of its population since its peak in the 1920s, and was declared a financially distressed municipality in 1988; it has no supermarkets, gas stations or ATMs. Fetterman was attracted to Braddock by what he called its "malignant beauty."

Fetterman served as the part-time mayor of Braddock and the full-time director of the city's youth program. He also founded a nonprofit organization, Braddock Redux, which he used to acquire and save properties in Braddock.

Fetterman's father helped subsidize Fetterman financially because the position of mayor paid only $150 per month. He received payments of $54,000 from his father in 2015. Fetterman has several tattoos related to the Braddock community. On his left arm are the numbers 15104—Braddock's ZIP Code—and on the right are the dates of nine murders that occurred in the town while he was mayor.

Elections
Fetterman ran for mayor against the incumbent, Pauline Abdullah, in 2005. With backing from the town's young residents, he won the Democratic primary by a single vote. Fetterman won the general election; he did not face a Republican opponent.

In the 2009 Democratic primary for mayor of Braddock, Fetterman faced Jayme Cox. During the 2009 campaign, Cox attacked Fetterman for failing to build a consensus with the town council. Additionally, Cox criticized Fetterman for abuse of power after Fetterman released non-public records that showed Cox was arrested in 2004. Braddock Solicitor Lawrence Shields agreed that Fetterman's conduct constituted "an abuse of [Fetterman's] mayoral authority" and violated the Pennsylvania Criminal History Record Information Act. Fetterman defeated Cox in the primary by a vote of 294 to 103. Fetterman handily won the Democratic primaries in 2013 and 2017, and was unopposed in the general election.

Tenure

First term
After his election, one of Fetterman's first acts was to set up a website for Braddock showing the town's mostly neglected and destroyed buildings. As mayor, Fetterman initiated youth and art programs and worked to develop the town's abandoned buildings and improve the poor economy. With family money, he purchased the town's First Presbyterian Church for $50,000 and lived in the basement for several months. The church was later turned into the town's community center. Fetterman later purchased an adjacent warehouse for $2,000, placed two shipping containers on the roof for extra living space, and moved in. Other programs included converting vacant lots into parks and gardens, building the town's first public basketball court, and establishing a two-acre organic urban farm, worked by teenagers of the Braddock Youth Project. To help fund programs, Fetterman established relationships with local nonprofit organizations, Allegheny County's economic development program, and then-county executive Dan Onorato. For example, Fetterman helped secure a $400,000 grant from the Heinz Foundation toward the building of a green roof, which provided 100 summer construction jobs for local youth.

Fetterman pitched Braddock to people around the country as a place to move due to the town's low real estate prices. The town's renaissance has attracted people from cities such as Chicago and Portland, Oregon, drawn by the potential for development and growth. Inspired by Fetterman's call, a group of Brooklyn residents moved to Braddock and transformed an abandoned church into an art center. But Braddock's redevelopment raised concerns about gentrification. Despite Fetterman's attempts to attract new residents to Braddock, the population has continued to hover around 2,000, and despite the property being cheap, many of the homes are condemned or are uninhabitable.

Typically, the mayor of Braddock holds administrative power over the Braddock Police Department. But during Fetterman's first term, he handed over those powers to the Braddock Police Chief, Frank DeBartolo, believing he could handle administrative duties more efficiently. Fetterman aimed to improve the relationship between Braddock's residents and the police by serving as a mediator during disputes. During his tenure as mayor, Braddock's homicide rate fell substantially, and for five years, there were no gun-related murders in Braddock.

In 2006, Fetterman opposed the expansion of Mon-Fayette Expressway, a partially completed four-lane highway that connects Western Pennsylvania and West Virginia. He argued that the planned expansion of the expressway would cut straight through Braddock and destroy the town.
 
While mayor, Fetterman had a contentious relationship with the town council. Some councilpersons viewed him with suspicion—seeing a white man serving as mayor of a majority-black town who pitched himself as the town's savior. Fetterman's tense relations with the town council have also been attributed to the fact that he did not attend many council meetings. In 2009, members of the town council attempted to have Fetterman removed from a town council meeting and arrested after he criticized a political opponent while delivering his mayoral report. The same year, council president Jesse Brown ordered Braddock's code enforcement officer to cite Fetterman for an occupancy permit violation for a building owned by Fetterman's nonprofit. A judge later dismissed the complaint. To avoid the town council's gridlock, Fetterman used his nonprofit to accomplish many of his ideas for Braddock, but that also resulted in less citizen input into the projects.

Second term
In November 2010, Fetterman was arrested and immediately released after refusing to leave the property of the U.S. Steel Tower in Pittsburgh. He was protesting the University of Pittsburgh Medical Center's controversial closure of Braddock Hospital; some in the community said he should have been more vocal in his opposition earlier. The Braddock Hospital employed 600 people and was Braddock's largest employer, and its closure left the town without a healthcare provider, although an urgent-care unit eventually opened in the town.

Also in November 2010, Fetterman took a leading role in trying to close down Club 804, a nightclub he described as a public nuisance to Braddock after the club was the site of a shooting. During his feud with Club 804, Fetterman changed the lettering on the club's signage from "Closed for renovations—will reopen soon" to "We will not be reopening soon." The club's owner criticized Fetterman, saying, "he had no right to touch our property". Two years later, the club renamed itself "Club Elegance" and Fetterman unsuccessfully sought to have it shut down for violating Braddock's ordinance that bans clubs with strippers from operating "within 300 feet of the property line of any school, church, day care center or community center".

Fetterman cast only one vote during his tenure as mayor. In 2012, he voted to help the borough council choose a president.

Starting in 2013, Fetterman began defying a 1996 Pennsylvania law that banned same-sex marriage and began to marry LGBT couples inside of his home.

In 2013, Fetterman and celebrity chef Kevin Sousa established a restaurant in Braddock, something the town had lacked. He bought a 3,000-square-foot former car dealership, intending to make it the site of the new restaurant, named Superior Motors. A Kickstarter was started, and funds were collected for the restaurant. Fetterman said that Superior Motors would provide jobs for Braddock residents, serve as an economic accelerant for the community, and "help people reimagine a space, a street, and a neighborhood".

The restaurant opened in 2017, but closed in 2021 amid the COVID-19 pandemic. Mayor Chardaé Jones, Fetterman's successor, criticized the restaurant for closing after only a few years and having received a Paycheck Protection Program loan for $190,000 in 2020.

Shotgun incident
Fetterman was criticized for an incident in North Braddock in January 2013 when he heard a sound he thought was gunfire and followed an unarmed jogger, whom he detained with a shotgun. The jogger, Chris Miyares, a black American, said that what Fetterman thought were gunshots were kids shooting bottle rockets. Fetterman said no debris had been found. Miyares claimed that Fetterman pointed the shotgun at his chest while he loaded the gun and then aimed the gun at his face. Fetterman denies that he pointed the gun at Miyares and said he only pointed the gun in a way to show that he was armed and that he "didn't even have a round chambered or the safety off." He said he believed he "did the right thing" and has not apologized. No charges were brought against either in connection with the incident, and Miyares never filed a formal complaint.

The incident gained new attention during Fetterman's Senate bid, with critics alleging a racial element to the incident. Fetterman's campaign denied allegations of racism, claiming that Miyares was wearing a black sweatsuit and mask, so Fetterman couldn't have identified his race or gender. Fetterman also added that Miyares was running in the direction of a school and that he made the decision to approach him with the firearm due to the event's proximity in time to the Sandy Hook Elementary School shooting.

In 2021, Miyares wrote that Fetterman had "lied about everything" that happened during the incident, that he had "done far more good than that one bad act" and "should not be defined by it", and that he hoped Fetterman would win the Senate race. Fetterman's political opponents have questioned Miyares's statement forgiving Fetterman.

Media coverage and criticism
Fetterman's efforts to create youth-oriented programs, revitalize his town, and attract artists and other "creatives" to his community were featured in The New York Times. A 2009 article in The Guardian called him "America's coolest mayor".

Fetterman appeared on the Colbert Report on February 25, 2009, discussing the economic difficulties his town faced due to a decreasing population, plummeting real estate values, and bankruptcy. He also questioned why funds from the American Recovery and Reinvestment Act of 2009 could not be used to support projects such as those in Braddock. He appeared again on August 16, 2010, discussing what he had been doing and the town's partnership with Levi Strauss.

In 2010, Levi Strauss & Company donated money towards Braddock's revitalization and featured the town in an advertising campaign and documentary produced by the Sundance Channel.

On May 7, 2012, Fetterman was featured on A Day in the Life; he discussed his work and goals for Braddock as well as his personal history and views.

Fetterman was a guest on The Nightly Show with Larry Wilmore on January 14, 2016. He talked about his support for Bernie Sanders in the Democratic primary and made a second appearance on July 19, 2016 talking about the 2016 election and Donald Trump.

While Fetterman was mayor in 2009, some Braddock residents, including the members of the town council, criticized him for his media appearances that emphasized what they saw as negative aspects of the town. Jesse Brown, Braddock's former town council president, said Fetterman "needs to tone down his rhetoric about the community and the bad shape the community is in and the devastation of the housing... If he feels that the community is bankrupt, then he needs to go somewhere where he'd like it." Tony Buba, a Braddock-based filmmaker, said "[Fetterman is] this big presence, and everyone thinks he’s John Wayne, [but it is] not that simple." Buba pointed out that while Fetterman was mayor, Braddock's population had stagnated, and while the average income had grown, it was still only $25,000 per household.

Lieutenant Governor of Pennsylvania (2019–2023)

Elections

2018 

On November 14, 2017, Fetterman announced that he would run for the Democratic nomination for lieutenant governor of Pennsylvania, challenging, among others, incumbent lieutenant governor Mike Stack. Stack was seen as a vulnerable incumbent after the Pennsylvania inspector general launched an investigation into Stack regarding allegations that he mistreated his staff and Pennsylvania state troopers. Fetterman was endorsed by Vermont senator Bernie Sanders, Pittsburgh mayor Bill Peduto and former Pennsylvania governor and Philadelphia mayor Ed Rendell.

On May 15, Fetterman won the Democratic primary for lieutenant governor with 38% of the vote. Fetterman was a part of the Democratic ticket along with incumbent governor Tom Wolf. On November 6, 2018, Wolf and Fetterman defeated the Republican ticket of Scott Wagner and Jeff Bartos in the general election.

Tenure

Fetterman was sworn into office as the lieutenant governor of Pennsylvania on January 15, 2019, replacing Mike Stack. One the first tasks Governor Tom Wolf gave him was to look into legalizing marijuana statewide. Fetterman went on a statewide tour, visiting all 67 Pennsylvania counties, and spoke to residents about legalization. After completing his tour, he published a report on his findings.In a show of support for marijuana legalization and the LGBTQ+ community, Fetterman hung the pride flag and a flag with a marijuana leaf from his office's balcony, which overlooks the state capitol. State employees removed them when an omnibus bill, signed into law by Wolf, banned unauthorized flags on capitol property. Fetterman continued to defy the law by flying the flags outside his office.

An Associated Press review of Fetterman's daily schedule during his tenure as lieutenant governor found that he kept a light work schedule and was often absent from official state business. From his inauguration in January 2019 until May 2022, Fetterman's official schedule was blank for one-third of workdays. Additionally, the days that he worked were often short, ranging from four to five hours. He was often absent from presiding over the Pennsylvania State Senate, an official duty of the lieutenant governor. In 2020, he attended only half of the sessions and in 2021 only a third.

Board of Pardons
The lieutenant governor has very little actual power, but does oversee the Pennsylvania Board of Pardons. In this position, Fetterman worked to increase commutations and pardons for those serving jail time in Pennsylvania. The Philadelphia Inquirer reported that Fetterman ran the Board of Pardons "with the heart of an activist and, at times, the force of a bully". The Inquirer also reported that he threatened to run against Attorney General Josh Shapiro, at the time planning a run for governor, unless Shapiro supported more pardons.

While chaired by Fetterman, the Board of Pardons recommended 50 commutations for life sentences, and Governor Wolf granted 47 commutations. As lieutenant governor, Fetterman announced "a coordinated effort for a one-time, large-scale pardoning project for people with select minor, nonviolent marijuana criminal convictions".

Donald Trump

In November 2020, Fetterman received national press coverage for saying Donald Trump was "no different than any other random internet troll" and that he "can sue a ham sandwich" in response to Trump threatening to file lawsuits in Pennsylvania alleging voter fraud in the 2020 presidential election.

Joe Biden won the 2020 presidential election in Pennsylvania, more than 81,000 votes ahead of Trump. Trump's claims of voter fraud led to a challenge of the results, and Texas attorney general Ken Paxton filed a suit to overturn the results in Pennsylvania and other states. Paxton's case was joined by 18 other Republican state attorneys general. Supporting that effort, Texas lieutenant governor Dan Patrick offered a reward of $1,000,000 to anyone who could prove a case of fraud in the affected states. Fetterman responded by certifying that Pennsylvania had discovered three cases of voter fraud: two men had cast ballots as their dead mothers (both for Trump) and another had voted on behalf of his son as well as himself (also for Trump). Fetterman said that Patrick should pay $1 million for each of these cases. He said he was proud to announce that Trump "got 100% of the dead mother vote" in Pennsylvania. Fetterman's lampooning of the alleged voting fraud received nationwide publicity.

U.S. Senate (2023–present)

Elections

2016 

On September 14, 2015, Fetterman announced his candidacy for the Democratic nomination for the U.S. Senate seat held by Pat Toomey in the 2016 election. His campaign was considered a long shot against two better-known candidates, Katie McGinty and Joe Sestak, the 2010 Democratic nominee for Senate. Fetterman was endorsed by former Maryland governor Martin O'Malley, former Pennsylvania treasurer Barbara Hafer, and the PennLive editorial board.

Fetterman's campaign focused on progressive values and building support through grassroots movement, drawing comparisons to Bernie Sanders. He was the only statewide Democratic candidate in Pennsylvania to endorse Sanders. Though lacking statewide name recognition, low on campaign funds, and polling as low as 4% a week before the primary, Fetterman garnered 20% of the primary vote. Katie McGinty, who spent $4,312,688 on the primary and was endorsed by Barack Obama and many U.S. senators, finished ahead of former congressman and admiral Joe Sestak, who raised $5,064,849, with Fetterman raising $798,981 and finishing third. After the primary, Fetterman campaigned on behalf of McGinty, who lost to Toomey in the general election.

2022 

In January 2021, Fetterman announced he was launching an exploratory committee for the 2022 U.S. Senate election in Pennsylvania. On February 4, 2021, Fetterman filed a statement of candidacy with the Federal Election Commission declaring his intention to run for the Senate seat being vacated by Toomey. On February 8, 2021, he officially entered the race.

Democratic primary
Fetterman's main opponent in the Democratic primary was U.S. representative Conor Lamb. A political action committee supporting Lamb ran ads attacking Fetterman as "a self-described democratic socialist". While the ad cited an NPR article that called Fetterman a socialist, The Philadelphia Inquirer wrote, "Fetterman has never actually described himself that way." Both Lamb and another candidate, Malcolm Kenyatta, criticized Fetterman for an incident where he pulled a loaded shotgun on a black jogger whom he believed had fired a gun.

While leading in many polls, Fetterman received few endorsements in the Democratic primary. State representative John I. Kane said that the lack of endorsements was characteristic of Fetterman's "lone wolf personality". Darisha Parker, a state representative from Philadelphia, argued that his lack of endorsements was because he had "never come and introduced himself to me or any of my colleagues... if a lieutenant governor doesn't take the time to get to talk to somebody like me, then why would we want to send somebody like him to D.C.?"

Fetterman won the Democratic primary with 58.7% of the vote to Lamb's 26.3%. He won every county including Philadelphia County, but struggled to win much of the city's black vote—capturing just 18% of the vote in the majority-black precincts. Fetterman's wife Gisele gave a victory speech on her husband's behalf, as he was hospitalized after suffering a stroke.

General election
In the general election Fetterman faced Republican nominee Mehmet Oz, a celebrity television doctor. According to The Philadelphia Citizen, Fetterman employed a social media campaign strategy consisting of shitposting and internet memes. The Daily Beast reported that Oz's New Jersey residency, net worth, and connections to Donald Trump were the focus of many of the memes. Criticizing Oz's previous residency in New Jersey became a particular hallmark of Fetterman's campaign, seeking to label Oz a carpetbagger. Efforts by the campaign to highlight Oz's New Jersey ties included enlisting New Jersey celebrities Snooki and Steven Van Zandt to record video messages aimed at Oz, and having a plane banner fly over the Jersey Shore reading "Hey Dr. Oz: Welcome home to N.J.! ❤️ John."

At an August 2022 rally in Erie, Fetterman appeared in public for the first time since recovering from his stroke; according to Politico, he "appeared physically healthy and mostly talked without any issues. At times, however, his speech was somewhat halted." In October 2022, he gave his first in-person interview since the stroke, with Dasha Burns, on NBC Nightly News with Lester Holt. As a result of his stroke, Fetterman required closed-captioning technology to read the questions as they were being asked out loud. Burns said that in their uncaptioned conversation before the interview, she was uncertain whether he could understand her. This drew criticism from other reporters, who said Fetterman did not exhibit such difficulty in other interviews.

In September 2022, Oz called on Fetterman to debate him before early voting began in Pennsylvania on September 19. Fetterman agreed to debate Oz in "the middle to end of October" but did not commit to an exact date or to a debate in September. Oz and Toomey criticized Fetterman's approach to the debate. The Washington Post wrote that it "raised questions about whether [Fetterman], still recovering from a serious stroke, is fit to serve in the Senate". On September 15, Oz and Fetterman agreed to a single debate on October 25.

Politico reported that Fetterman struggled during the debate "to effectively communicate—missing words, pausing awkwardly and speaking haltingly", while The New York Times reported that "he was also fluent enough over the course of the hour to present his Democratic vision for a state that could determine control of the Senate". According to the Times, Fetterman was an uneven debater even before his stroke. Republicans seized on his appearances and behavior after the stroke to suggest that he was not fit for office; according to medical experts, speech impairment after a stroke does not indicate cognitive impairment. Senator Chris Coons said that the debate "was hard to watch" but that Pennsylvanians would still be attracted to Fetterman's candidacy because of his "record of what he’s done in Braddock [and] as lieutenant governor".

On November 9, media outlets projected Fetterman as the winner of the election.

Tenure 
Fetterman took office on January 3, 2023. Fetterman is tied with Luther Strange as the tallest U.S. senator in history, and is the tallest elected senator and tallest serving senator.

To assist with Fetterman's stroke-related speech processing issues, the Senate chamber was outfitted with closed captioning technology at his desk and the front of the chamber.

In February 2023, Fetterman attended his first Agriculture Committee hearing. He asked questions about trade and organic farming, but stumbled slightly over his words.

Fetterman’s adjustment to the Senate has been “extraordinarily challenging — even with the [extensive] accommodations that have been made to help him adapt.”

Fetterman was hospitalized for syncope (lightheartedness) for two days beginning February 10.  Two days after his release he was hospitalized again, this time for a severe case of major depression. Since then, he has lived and worked at the  Walter Reed Army Medical Center. His chief of staff arrives at the hospital at 10 a.m. on weekdays with newspaper clips, statements for Fetterman to approve, and legislation to review. During his hospitalization, Fetterman has co-sponsored a bipartisan rail safety bill, introduced after the derailment of a chemical-carrying train in East Palestine, Ohio, close to the border with Pennsylvania; the regulation aimed to strengthen freight-rail safety regulations to prevent future derailments. Unfortunately, he has not been able to vote in the Senate during his hospitalization.

Committee assignments
Committee on Agriculture, Nutrition, and Forestry
Committee on Banking, Housing, and Urban Affairs
Committee on Environment and Public Works
Joint Economic Committee
Special Committee on Aging

Political positions

Fetterman is often described as a social and fiscal progressive, including by himself. When running for Senate in 2022, Fetterman said that he is not a progressive and is "just a Democrat", explaining that many parts of his platform that were once considered progressive are now mainstream beliefs of the party. In 2022, The New York Times characterized Fetterman as "left-leaning". Fordham University political science professor Christina Greer described Fetterman, alongside New York City Mayor Eric Adams, as “simultaneously progressive, moderate and conservative”.

Abortion
In a Democratic primary debate in May 2022, Fetterman said regarding abortion: "That is between a woman and her physician". To the question if any exceptions exist, he said: "It's certainly not between me or any politician. We settled this decades ago, and the fact that these states are trying to repeal it... we have to push back on that." Later that month, Fetterman reiterated his position opposing any legal restrictions on abortion, including in the third trimester.

During his debate with Oz, Fetterman said he supported the framework in Roe v. Wade, which allows the state to restrict abortions after the first trimester.

Congressional stock ownership
Fetterman supports barring members of Congress and their immediate families from trading or holding stocks.

Criminal justice reform
Prison reform is one of Fetterman's signature issues, advocating for more rehabilitation action as well as clemency for model prisoners. A part of his role as lieutenant governor, he serves as the chair of Pennsylvania's Board of Pardons, which processes clemency requests and forwards them to the governor. Fetterman urged the board to process requests more quickly.

Fetterman is in favor of abolishing capital punishment in Pennsylvania, stating that he "wholly support[s] Governor Tom Wolf's moratorium on the death penalty". He has called the death penalty "inhumane, antiquated, expensive, and [a] flawed system of punishment".

Fetterman supports the elimination of mandatory sentences of life in prison without the possibility of parole for second degree murder, in which someone commits a felony resulting in death, but is not directly responsible for the killing. He does not support eliminating life without parole as a sentence. His Senate race opponent, Mehmet Oz, claimed that Fetterman supports "eliminat[ing] life sentences for murderers", which PolitiFact and other fact-checking outlets called a distortion of Fetterman's position.

Environmental issues
Previously, Fetterman opposed fracking, calling the practice "an environmental abomination". He has since shifted his stance on the issue, saying that he supports permitting fracking, although he advocates for stricter environmental regulations. Fetterman says there needs to be a balance between decarbonization efforts and creating jobs in the fossil fuel industry. While running for lieutenant governor, he supported establishing two new fracking wells. In 2021, Fetterman said that he supports moving towards a "de facto moratorium [on fracking] because the transition is going to be toward green and renewable energy". In February 2021, he told MSNBC, "I'm embracing what the green ideal considers a priority. Like, you know, the Green New Deal isn't a specific piece of legislation. What I am in support of is acknowledging that the climate crisis is absolutely real."

Filibuster
Fetterman supports ending the filibuster in the United States Senate. He has also said that Democrats need to be more ruthless, like Republicans, in order to pass legislative priorities.

Foreign policy
In 2015, The Patriot-News described Fetterman as a "skeptic of free trade", given his opposition to the Trans-Pacific Partnership, and a non-interventionist. Fetterman has said that the United States should not "be considered the world's police officers".

Israel
Fetterman is a strong supporter of Israel–United States relations and said if he is elected as a U.S. senator, he will "lean in" on the "relationship between the United States and Israel". He said that the U.S.–Israel relationship "is a special one that needs to be safeguarded, protected, supported and nurtured through legislation and all available diplomatic efforts in the region". He supports United States foreign aid to Israel, including Iron Dome funding. Fetterman criticized congressional Democrats who voted against Iron Dome funding, calling them "fringe" and "extreme". He has said he supports Israel's right to defend itself and is "passionate" in his opposition to the Boycott, Divestment and Sanctions movement. He supported a law signed by Pennsylvania governor Tom Wolf that barred Pennsylvania from entering into contracts with companies that boycott Israel. He supports a two-state solution and the expansion of the Abraham Accords, the Arab-Israeli agreements brokered under the Trump administration.

Gun policy
Fetterman supports greater restrictions on gun purchases.

Healthcare
Fetterman has described himself as a supporter of Medicare for All, saying that healthcare is a "fundamental human need and right". Fetterman's website states that "Healthcare is a fundamental human right," and that he would "support whatever path" is necessary to expand healthcare accessibility including the expansion of Obamacare. In debate, he reaffirmed he would vote for Medicare for All.

Marijuana
Fetterman is a proponent of legalizing marijuana, calling the issue a "political bazooka" and that leaving the issue alone is giving an opportunity for another party to gain political support for a pro–marijuana legalization agenda. He argued that if conservative South Dakota voters were willing to approve a ballot measure legalizing recreational marijuana, Pennsylvania should legalize it too. He also supports expunging criminal convictions related to marijuana.

Minimum wage
Fetterman supports raising the minimum wage to $15 an hour.

Policing
Fetterman has described himself as "pro-policing", including pro-community policing. He opposes defunding the police, calling the movement "absurd", but supports the Black Lives Matter movement. After Derek Chauvin, a police officer who murdered an unarmed black man, George Floyd, was convicted of second-degree murder, Fetterman tweeted his support for the verdict, stating that Chauvin was "clearly guilty."

As lieutenant governor, Fetterman supported legislation that would allow the police to use deadly force only in situations where officers or others nearby face imminent threat of death or serious injury.

Taxation
Fetterman supports implementing a wealth tax in the United States. He has said those "who have yachts" could be used as a potential benchmark.

Unions
Fetterman is a supporter of labor unions, saying "The union way of life is sacred". He is a supporter of the PRO Act.

Personal life

Fetterman is married to Gisele Barreto Fetterman, a Brazilian-American activist. Almeida, who was once an undocumented immigrant and a resident of Newark, New Jersey, heard about Fetterman's work as mayor of Braddock and wrote him a letter in 2007. Fetterman invited Almeida to visit Braddock, and a year later they were married. The couple has three children and they live in a converted car dealership with their rescue dogs, Levi and Artie. The family chose to not live in State House, the official residence for Pennsylvania's lieutenant governor.

In 2008, Allegheny County sued Fetterman and his nonprofit Braddock Redux for unpaid taxes. A tax lien was placed against Fetterman and his nonprofit for $25,000. In 2012, Fetterman paid off the unpaid taxes.

In fall 2020, Gisele Fetterman shared a photo of the family's home while John was being interviewed. Levi's humorous facial expression resulted in the photograph going viral. The next day, an unconnected fan of Levi created a Twitter account in his name and became friends with Gisele Fetterman, but remains anonymous. Levi and Artie have their own Twitter account with more than 25,000 followers. Levi is a mixed-breed dog and was featured in the CW's television special "Dogs of the Year 2021". In July 2021, the York Daily Record reported that Levi was an advocate for the increase of the state license fee for dog owners to fund the Pennsylvania bureau tasked with canine law enforcement, such as dealing with dangerous dogs and exposing puppy mills.

Fetterman is known for his casual style of dress. He is often seen wearing a sweatshirt and shorts, and long owned only one suit, which he wore when presiding over the Pennsylvania Senate, where there is a dress code. Fetterman purchased a new suit for his swearing-in as a U.S. senator.

The Philadelphia Inquirer reported that Fetterman has a net worth between $717,000 and $1.58 million.

Health
According to Fetterman's Chief of Staff, Adam Jentleson, Fetterman has struggled with depression throughout his life.

In 2017, Fetterman's feet suddenly began to swell and he was subsequently hospitalized for testing. At that time, he was diagnosed by cardiologist Ramesh Chandra with "atrial fibrillation, an irregular heart rhythm, along with a decreased heart pump", although this diagnosis was not known publicly until Fetterman's stroke in May 2022.

In 2018, Fetterman spoke publicly about his substantial weight loss.

On June 4, 2019, The Philadelphia Inquirer reported that Fetterman "collapsed" while presiding over the State Senate; he became wobbly and grabbed the lectern to prevent himself from falling over, and a member of the Capitol's nursing staff came to examine him. Afterward, Fetterman's spokesperson said he had become overheated and was "back to normal".
 
On May 13, 2022, Fetterman suffered an ischemic stroke and was hospitalized. The stroke was caused by a clot caused by atrial fibrillation (irregular heart rhythm). Because Fetterman also had cardiomyopathy, his doctors implanted a pacemaker and defibrillator. He was discharged from the hospital on May 22, 2022.

In an early June 2022 letter, Chandra wrote that Fetterman was "well compensated and stable" and that "If he takes his medications, eats healthy and exercises, he'll be fine." His doctors reported that Fetterman did not suffer cognitive damage, and that they expected a full recovery. Fetterman expressed regret for having ignored his health; after the 2017 diagnosis with atrial fibrillation, he did not see a doctor for five years and did not continue medications.

In an October 2022 letter providing a medical update, Fetterman's primary care physician said that he "spoke intelligently without cognitive deficits" during examination and had significantly improved communication compared to his first visit with the doctor. Fetterman's stroke left him with symptoms of an auditory processing disorder, and he uses closed captioning as an aid to read speech in real time. The physician noted that Fetterman regularly attends speech therapy, routinely exercises, takes appropriate heart medications, and "has no work restrictions and can work full duty in public office."

On February 8, 2023, Fetterman was hospitalized overnight after feeling lightheaded during a U.S. Senate retreat earlier that day. His office reported that he was in "good spirits and talking with his staff and family", and that his hospitalization was unrelated to his stroke. On February 16, 2023, Fetterman checked himself into Walter Reed Hospital due to clinical depression. A senior aide later said Fetterman would remain hospitalized for "likely less than two months" while he underwent treatment.

Film
Fetterman made a cameo appearance in the 2022 film The Pale Blue Eye. In December 2022, he posted a photo of himself and his wife alongside actor Christian Bale on the set of the film. Fetterman also worked with Bale and the film's director, Scott Cooper, in 2013, when they filmed Out of the Furnace in Braddock.

Electoral history

Notes

References

External links

Senator John Fetterman official U.S. Senate website
Fetterman for Pennsylvania  campaign website

John Fetterman at Politifact

|-

|-

|-

|-

|-

|-

1969 births
21st-century American philanthropists
21st-century American politicians
Albright Lions football players
American politicians with disabilities
American social workers
Candidates in the 2016 United States Senate elections
Democratic Party United States senators from Pennsylvania
Harvard Kennedy School alumni
Lieutenant Governors of Pennsylvania
Living people
Mayors of places in Pennsylvania
People from Braddock, Pennsylvania
People with mood disorders
Philanthropists from Pennsylvania
Players of American football from Pennsylvania
Politicians from Reading, Pennsylvania
Politicians from York, Pennsylvania
University of Connecticut alumni
Politicians from Allegheny County, Pennsylvania